Trecenydd is a residential area in Caerphilly, Wales, United Kingdom.

It is near the centre of Caerphilly and is relatively small compared to other areas of Caerphilly.

Trecenydd has several schools in its vicinity: Hendre Infant School, Hendre Junior School, and also St Cenydd Comprehensive School

External links
www.geograph.co.uk : photos of Trecenydd and surrounding area

Caerphilly